Freedom Flight is Marty Balin's 1997 studio album.  Unlike his previous solo efforts which utilized many supporting musicians, this album had Marty performing only with his own guitar work and some background vocalists.

Track listing
All songs by Richard Landers except where noted.
"Beautiful Girl" (Landers, Gale Landers) – 3:15
"Fire" – 4:13
"My Heart Picked You" – 2:52
"Until You" – 3:59
"Can't Forget the Night" – 3:43
"A Part of Me" – 4:30
"Sexy Eyes" (Landers, Landers) – 3:39
"Heart of Stone" – 4:33
"Goddess" (Marty Balin) – 4:06
"Freedom Flight" – 3:36

Personnel
Marty Balin - Guitar / Vocals
Nannette Britt - Background Vocals
Vickie Carrico - Background Vocals
Kelli Bruce - Background Vocals

References

1997 albums
Marty Balin albums